Stephen Payn was Dean of Exeter between 1415 and 1419. He was preceded by Ralph Tregrision and followed by John Cobethorn.

Notes

Deans of Exeter